Articles with relevant content include:
 
 Demographics of Punjab, India